The Lyons trailhead or Lyons Creek trailhead is located on Wrights Lake Road off Highway 50 about halfway to Wrights Lake.

Some of the destinations most accessed by the trailhead are Lyons Lake and Sylvia Lake as well as the rest of the Desolation Wilderness. The summit of Pyramid Peak (California) can be reached from this trailhead as well.

External links 
USDA Forest Service Trailhead Information

 

Lake Tahoe
Sierra Nevada (United States)
Eldorado National Forest